The Angus transmitting station is a broadcasting and telecommunications facility, situated approximately five miles due north of the city of Dundee, between the villages of Charleston and Tealing, Scotland. It includes a guyed steel lattice mast which is 229.5 metres (753 ft) in height.  Mounted at the top are the UHF television antennas, contained within a GRP shroud.  These antennas have an average height above Ordnance Datum of 547 metres (1,795 ft). It is owned and operated by Arqiva.

History
It was constructed in 1966 by the ITA, having been chosen as a suitable site for high power colour UHF transmissions.

Coverage area
It covers parts of the City of Dundee, eastern Perth and Kinross, southern Angus and north and east Fife.  Reception is also possible in much of north and east Edinburgh and the coastal areas of East Lothian, as far along as the town of Dunbar.

Channels listed by frequency

Analogue radio (FM VHF)

† Mixed polarisation.

Digital radio (DAB)

Television

Analogue

28 July 1969 – 1972

1972 – November 1982

November 1982 – 14 November 1998

Analogue and digital

15 November 1998 – 3 August 2010
Digital terrestrial television was first transmitted from the Angus mast from 15 November 1998 using the frequency gaps between the analogue TV broadcasts. To limit interference to the analogue transmissions, power output on the digital multiplexes was low.

4 August 2010 - 17 August 2010

On 4 August 2010, BBC2 was switched off on UHF 63 and ITV1 was switched from UHF 60 for its final weeks of service. Multiplex 1 on UHF 68 was closed and replaced by BBC A on UHF 60 (which had just been vacated by analogue ITV1). BBC A was transmitted at full power (20 kW) and in 64QAM, 8k carriers mode from the start.

Digital

18 August 2010 to 16 April 2013

Following the completion of analogue TV shutdown on 18 August 2010, Angus transmitted all of its higher powered multiplexes at 20 kW for PSB 1, 2 and 3, and 10 kW for COM 4, 5 and 6. From this date the frequency allocation was:

17 April 2013 to 26 November 2019

Due to the clearance of the 800 MHz band, Arqiva B was moved from UHF 61 to UHF 49 and BBC A gained a negative offset. Also during this time, COM 7 and 8 and the Local TV multiplex launched.

27 November 2019 to 24 June 2020
Due to the clearance of the 700 MHz band, the following channels come into use:

25 June 2020 to Present
Due to the clearance of UHF 56 (COM8), in the 700 MHz band, the following channels come into use:

See also
List of masts
List of tallest buildings and structures in Great Britain
List of radio stations in the United Kingdom

References

External links

Photographs and information at  The Transmission Gallery
Angus Transmitter at thebigtower

Transmitter sites in Scotland